Lycium cooperi is a species of flowering plant in the nightshade family known by the common name peach thorn. It is native to the southwestern United States,  where it grows in a variety of desert and mountain habitat types. The flower is white or greenish with lavender or green veining. The corolla is a tube opening into a face with four or five lobes. The fruit is a yellow or orange berry under a centimeter wide containing many seeds.

References

External links
Photo gallery

cooperi
Flora of the Southwestern United States